Cap Aurora is a small Romanian summer-time seaside resort in the Mangalia municipality, Constanța County. It is located between the neighbouring resorts of Jupiter and Venus, also within the municipality.

External links
Cap Aurora Resort

Mangalia
Seaside resorts in Romania